Panic (Originally Bakterion, also released as Zombie 4 in Greece) is a 1982 Italian / Spanish film directed by Tonino Ricci.

Plot summary 

A scientist is accidentally mutated into a blood-drinking monster by the pathogens upon which he was experimenting.  The government, fearful that the disease may be contagious, orders an air strike of the small town where the monster operates.  With the lives of over a thousand people on the line, a lone agent must race against time to kill the monster before the air strike takes place.

Cast 
David Warbeck as Captain Kirk
Janet Agren as Jane Blake
Roberto Ricci as Professor Adams
José Lifante as Sergeant O'Brien
Miguel Herrera as Professor Vince
Eugenio Benito as Father Braun
Ovidio Taito
José María Labernié as Colonel Rutledge
Ilaria Maria Bianchi
Fabián Conde as Drunk
Vittorio Calò
Franco Ressel as Mr. Milton

See also       
 List of Italian films of 1982

Soundtrack

External links 

Panic at Variety Distributions

1982 films
Italian science fiction horror films
Spanish science fiction horror films
1982 horror films
1980s Italian-language films
Films directed by Tonino Ricci
Films scored by Marcello Giombini
1980s Italian films
1980s Spanish films
1970s Italian films
Films about viral outbreaks